WEPH (channel 49) is a religious television station in Tupelo, Mississippi, United States, owned and operated by the Christian Television Network (CTN). The station's studios are located on County Road 1702 in Tupelo, and its transmitter is located northwest of Woodland, Mississippi.

History

The station was founded in October 2010. It is the only full-power television station (excepting the MPB stations in Booneville, Oxford and Mississippi State) in northeast Mississippi to have never been affiliated with a major commercial television network.

Technical information

Subchannels
The station's digital signal is multiplexed:

Out-of-market coverage
WEPH is also carried outside the Tupelo–Columbus market on some cable systems in the Mississippi Delta, as well as Franklin, Amite and Perry counties in southern Mississippi.

References

External links 
Official website

Television channels and stations established in 2010
EPH
Christian Television Network affiliates
2010 establishments in Mississippi